Rancio Valcuvia is a comune (municipality) in the Province of Varese in the Italian region Lombardy, located about  northwest of Milan and about  northwest of Varese.

Rancio Valcuvia borders the following municipalities: Bedero Valcuvia, Brinzio, Cassano Valcuvia, Castello Cabiaglio, Cuveglio, Ferrera di Varese, Masciago Primo.

References

Cities and towns in Lombardy